Poopak Goldarreh (30 July 1971 – 16 April 2006) was an Iranian actress, mostly famous in Iran because of her appearance in TV series such as Saat-e khosh and Nargess. She played some roles in a few movies as well. Goldarreh was involved in a car accident on her way to Noor region in the north of Iran which left her in coma for 8 months. She died on 16 April 2006 at 34 years of age, and was buried in the artists' block of Behesht-e Zahra.

She received the award for the best actress for the film The Dead Wave directed by Ebrahim Hatamikia. Starting with the show Happy Hour, she went on to receive honorary award from Fajr Film Festival.

References
 ایران‌اکتور
 برداشت آزاد با ذکر منبع

External links
 

1971 births
2006 deaths
People from Tehran
Actresses from Tehran
Iranian film actresses
University of Tehran alumni
Iranian television actresses
Road incident deaths in Iran
21st-century Iranian actresses
Burials at artist's block of Behesht-e Zahra